The 1974 United States Senate election in Iowa took place on November 5, 1974. Incumbent Democratic U.S. Senator Harold E. Hughes retired. The open seat was won by U.S. Representative John C. Culver, defeating Republican State Representative David M. Stanley. , this was the most recent election in which Democrats, or anyone other than Chuck Grassley won the Class 3 Senate seat in Iowa.

Republican primary

Candidates
 George Milligan, State Senator from Des Moines
 David M. Stanley, State Representative from Muscatine and nominee for Senate in 1968

Results

General election

Results

See also 
 1974 United States Senate elections

References

1974
Iowa
United States Senate